The Pilatus PC-8D Twin Porter was a Swiss ten-seat light transport built by Pilatus Aircraft. The type did not go into production and only one was built.

Work on the Twin Porter started in 1966, it was a modified Pilatus PC-6 high-wing monoplane with the nose-mounted engine removed and two 290 hp Lycoming IO-540-GIB engines mounted on the wing leading edges. The prototype first flew on 28 November 1967. Only one aircraft was built as flight testing was halted in 1969.

Specifications

See also

References 

 

PC-8
1960s Swiss civil utility aircraft
High-wing aircraft
Aircraft first flown in 1967
Twin piston-engined tractor aircraft
STOL aircraft